"That Girl" is a song by Dutch Euro-House, Dance and pop singer Mischa Daniels, featuring vocals from Pop, R&B and Hip-Hop singer U-Jean. The song was released in the Netherlands as a digital download on June 11, 2012. The song has peaked to number 95 on the German Singles Chart.

Music video
A music video to accompany the release of "That Girl" was first released onto YouTube on June 12, 2012 at a total length of three minutes and five seconds.

Track listing
 Digital download
 "That Girl" (Radio Edit) – 2:50
 "That Girl" (Solid Gaz Radio Edit) – 4:02
 "That Girl" (Extended Mix) – 4:21
 "That Girl" (Solid Gaz Remix) – 6:03

Chart performance

Release history

References

External links
 Mischa Daniels on Facebook

2012 singles
2012 songs
Songs written by Jenson Vaughan